Adhewada is a village in Bhavnagar Taluka of Bhavnagar district in Gujarat, India. The village is located on the northern bank of the Maleshree or Maleshvari River and about three miles south of Bhavnagar.

History
Adhewada was granted by  Gohil Ramdasji to his son Sadulji, and his descendants are still surviving.

Places of interest
The Jajdia Hanuman derives its name from the deserted village of Jajdi and the temple stands on the ruined site. Now the temple is also referred as Zanzaria Hanuman temple.
Fulsariya Hanuman is also located near Zanzaria Hanuman its also huge Temple of Hanuman and lord Shiva. It is known for is kitchen which is open for pilgrims 24/7.
Rata Khada Khodiyar is Also opposite there.

References

 This article incorporates text from a publication now in the public domain: 

Cities and towns in Bhavnagar district